Jaroslava Pokorná (born 2 August 1948) is a Czech film and stage actress. She was named Best Actress at the 2005 Alfréd Radok Awards for her role in The Wild Duck at the Divadlo v Dlouhé. She won the Czech Lion award for Best Supporting Actress in 2013 for her role in the mini-series Burning Bush.

Selected filmography 
Boredom in Brno (2003)
Okresní přebor (television, 2010)
Burning Bush (2013)
''Charlatan (2020)

References

External links

1946 births
Living people
Czech film actresses
Czechoslovak film actresses
Czech stage actresses
Czechoslovak stage actresses
Actresses from Prague
20th-century Czech actresses
21st-century Czech actresses
Academy of Performing Arts in Prague alumni